Braulio Jesús Vázquez Benítez (born 14 March 1972), simply known as Braulio, is a Spanish football manager and former player who played as a forward. He is the current sporting director of CA Osasuna.

Career
As a player, Braulio's career consisted mostly of Segunda División B appearances. His professional inputs included two La Liga matches for Deportivo de La Coruña, aside from a two-season spell with Portuguese Primeira Liga side S.C. Farense and one year with CP Mérida in Segunda División.

After retiring, Braulio worked as a manager for Soneira SD and Laracha CF before joining Valencia CF as a technical secretary. He subsequently moved to the sporting director position at the latter club in 2010, later working under the same role at Real Valladolid and CA Osasuna.

Personal life
Braulio's son Jesús is also a footballer. A left back, he was a Valencia youth graduate.

References

External links

1972 births
Living people
Footballers from Pontevedra
Spanish footballers
Association football forwards
La Liga players
Segunda División players
Segunda División B players
Tercera División players
Deportivo Fabril players
Deportivo de La Coruña players
CP Mérida footballers
CD Castellón footballers
Zamora CF footballers
Novelda CF players
CD Lugo players
Bergantiños FC players
Primeira Liga players
S.C. Farense players
Spanish expatriate footballers
Spanish expatriate sportspeople in Portugal
Expatriate footballers in Portugal
Spanish football managers